Jñatjo (from the Mazahua endonym Tetjo ñaa jñatjo, roughly meaning "those who speak their own language") may refer to:
 Mazahua people
 Mazahua language

Language and nationality disambiguation pages